State Route 139 (SR 139) is a  state highway in Jefferson and Sevier counties in the eastern portion of the U.S. state of Tennessee. It connects Strawberry Plains to Dandridge.

Route description

SR 139 begins in Jefferson County in Strawberry Plains at an intersection with US 11E/SR 34. The road heads southeast through farmland to an intersection and becomes concurrent with US 25W/US 70/SR 9 at an intersection with Snyder Road, which serves as a connector to SR 66 and I-40. The highway travels west for a short distance before crossing into Sevier County. SR 139 then splits off and goes southeast again to pass under I-40 before entering Kodak. It passes through the downtown area before leaving Kodak and passing through Beech Springs before returning to Kodak and coming to an intersection with SR 66. SR 139 then leaves Kodak for the final time and passes through farmland before having an intersection with SR 338 and crossing back into Jefferson County. SR 139 then runs alongside Douglas Lake and passes by its many marinas and lake homes before entering Dandridge and coming to and end at an intersection with SR 92 in downtown.

Junction list

See also
 
 
 List of state routes in Tennessee

References

139
Transportation in Jefferson County, Tennessee
Transportation in Sevier County, Tennessee